The July 2017 Telekom Cup was the 9th edition of the Telekom Cup, a football friendly tournament organized by Deutsche Telekom, who was also the sponsor. It was hosted by Borussia Mönchengladbach at the BORUSSIA-PARK in Mönchengladbach, on 15 July 2017. Alongside the hosts, Bayern Munich, 1899 Hoffenheim, and Werder Bremen also took part.

Bayern Munich won their fourth title following a 2–0 win over Werder Bremen in the final.

Participants

Bracket

Matches
All matches lasted for just 45 minutes. If a match was level after normal time then a penalty shoot-out was played to decide who advanced.

All times Central European Summer Time (UTC+2)

Semi-finals

Third place play-off

Final

Goalscorers

References

External links

German football friendly trophies
2017–18 in German football
Sport in Mönchengladbach
July 2017 sports events in Germany
21st century in Mönchengladbach